The  Green Bay Blizzard season was the team's fourteenth season as a professional indoor football franchise and seventh in the Indoor Football League (IFL). One of ten teams that competed in the IFL for the 2016 season, the Green Bay Blizzard were members of the United Conference.

Led by head coach Chris Williams, the Blizzard played their home games at the Resch Center in the Green Bay suburb of Ashwaubenon, Wisconsin.

Schedule
Key:

Regular season
All start times are local time

Standings

Roster

References

External links
Green Bay Blizzard official website
Green Bay Blizzard official statistics
Green Bay Blizzard at Green Bay Press-Gazette

Green Bay Blizzard seasons
Green Bay Blizzard
Green Bay Blizzard